Jose Manuel Botana Vazquez (born 24 January 1974), is a former Venezuelan  futsal player of The Asociación Mundial de Futsal (AMF), is one of the members in the title of Venezuela national futsal team in AMF world cup 1997 celebrated in Guadalajara, Mexico.

External links

Venezuelan men's futsal players
Living people
1974 births